Virlog (in older sources also Virloh) is a settlement in the Municipality of Škofja Loka in the Upper Carniola region of Slovenia.

References

External links

Virlog at Geopedia

Populated places in the Municipality of Škofja Loka